Anarchopterus is a genus of pipefishes native to the western Atlantic Ocean.

Species
There are currently two recognized species in this genus:
 Anarchopterus criniger (T. H. Bean & Dresel, 1884) (Fringed pipefish)
 Anarchopterus tectus (C. E. Dawson, 1978) (Insular pipefish)

References

 
Marine fish genera
Taxa named by Carl Leavitt Hubbs